Dinant is the name of the railway station in the Belgian city of Dinant. The station is operated by the national railway company NMBS.

Train services
The station is served by the following services:
Intercity services (IC 17) Dinant - Namur - Brussels National Airport
Local services Namur - Dinant - Libramont

Railway stations in Belgium
Railway stations in Namur (province)